Cleo S. Youtz (1909–2005) was an American statistician who worked for many years at Harvard University as the research assistant, collaborator, computer, and coauthor of Frederick Mosteller, as manager of Mosteller's other staff, and as the historian of the Harvard statistics department. Youtz was hired by Mosteller in 1957 when he was appointed chair of the newly formed department, and continued working with Mosteller after he retired from teaching in 1987, until he finally left Harvard in 2003.

Selected publications
Although Mosteller did not list Youtz as a coauthor on all of his publications, she was listed on many, including:

One of the few publications crediting her as a contributor but not written with Mosteller was a festschrift for Mosteller's 70th birthday, A Statistical Model: Frederick Mosteller's Contributions to Statistics, Science, and Public Policy (1990), which listed her as a collaborator on its title page and stated that "but for her
modesty" she should have been listed as one of its editors.

References

1909 births
2005 deaths
American statisticians
American women statisticians